Al-Mishtaya is a village in northwestern Syria, administratively part of the Homs Governorate, located west of Homs and north of the border with Lebanon. Nearby localities include al-Husn to the southeast, Zweitina to the west, Marmarita to the northwest and al-Nasirah to the north. According to the Syria Central Bureau of Statistics (CBS), al-Mishtaya had a population of 1,002 in the 2004 census. Its inhabitants are predominantly Greek Orthodox Christians.

Saint George's Monastery in Al-Mishtaya is considered one of the main tourist attraction in the region of Valley of Christians.

See also
Wadi al-Nasara

References

Populated places in Talkalakh District
Villages in Syria
Eastern Orthodox Christian communities in Syria
Christian communities in Syria